The Monticello Nuclear Generating Plant is a nuclear power plant located in Monticello, Minnesota, along the Mississippi River.  The site, which began operating in 1971, has a single nuclear reactor (boiling water reactor) of the General Electric BWR-3 design generating 671 MWe. The reactor was originally licensed until 2010; a renewal license issued in 2006 allows it to continue operating until September 8, 2030.

The plant is owned by Xcel Energy and operated by Northern States Power, its regional subsidiary.

Electricity Production

Surrounding population

According to the 2010 U.S. Census, the population was 62,976 within  of Monticello, an increase of 36.5 percent in a decade; and 2,977,934 within , an increase of 8.6 percent. Cities within 50 miles include the Twin Cities of Minneapolis (38 miles to city center) and St. Paul (45 miles to city center).

The Monticello section of the Mississippi River remains unfrozen during winter and attracts hundreds of trumpeter swans, largely due to warm water discharged by the nuclear plant.

Incidents and updates
Roughly 1,300 gallons (4.9 cubic meters) of radioactive water which accidentally leaked from the plant into the Mississippi River in an incident on 5 May 1982, was determined to be "no threat" to the public. 

In January 2007 a 13-ton control box fell eight to twelve inches and caused an unexpected shutdown. This control box was located in the condenser room of the turbine building and contained valves which controlled steam pressure. Emergency response teams at the station deemed that the event was likely caused by inadequate welds at the time of installation and fatigue due to vibrations over the life of the plant.

Construction of the on-site independent spent fuel storage installation (ISFSI) pad began in June 2007.  The target date for the completion of the pads was December 2007 with insertion of the first ten dry storage containers (holding spent fuel assemblies ) into horizontal storage modules (HSMs) in mid-2008.  Initially, 12 HSMs will be placed on the storage pad.  Each HSM—a thick, reinforced, pre-cast concrete structure about the size of a single car garage—has the capacity to hold 61 fuel bundles.

On September 11, 2008, a cable fault tripped the transformer which supplied power to the site. This resulted in a loss of off-site power and the plant automatically shut down.

On September 18, 2008, an employee for a rental equipment company was electrocuted by one phase of the 115-kV power line outside of the plant due to a lack of situational awareness. The individual was raising a bucket lift without watching overhead and contacted one phase of the 115-kV line.  The plant was offline at the time due to the forced outage described above.

In February 2011, the site's plant officials determined that four control rod blades could be affected by a potentially substantial safety hazard. Vice President Tim O'Connor indicated that the blades would be replaced in March.

In 2006, Xcel Energy proposed a series of upgrades to the plant in order to increase its output and extend its life for an additional 20 years. In December 2013, the Nuclear Regulatory Commission approved  the license amendment allowing the unit to increase output from 600 MWe to 671 MWe However, final project implementation costs significantly outstripped initial estimates by more than $400 million. In 2015, the Minnesota Public Utilities Commission denied full cost recovery and determined that, while Xcel Energy could include the additional cost in customer rates, it could not earn a return on those costs. Xcel Energy would record a greater than $100 million loss in 1Q 2015 as a result and recouped $27 million less than expected from the project.

In March 2013, the plant was shut down for a routine refueling. During this time, workers replaced several original plant components. This increased the plant's electrical output from the original 600 MWe to 671 MWe. In early August, the plant was brought back online with the new equipment. Refueling outages as such increase the population of the plant's workforce by the thousands.

In November 2022, 400,000 gallons (more than 1500 cubic meters) of water contaminated with tritium leaked from a water pipe running between two buildings at the facility. Only 25% of the released tritium was recovered as of March 16, 2023, with cleanup continuing.

Seismic risk
The Nuclear Regulatory Commission's estimate of the risk each year of an earthquake intense enough to cause core damage to the reactor at Monticello was 1 in 52,632, according to an NRC study published in August 2010.

See also

List of power stations in Minnesota

References

footnote number 6:

Nuclear Regulatory Commission, Preliminary Notification – Region III, Sept. 15, 2008, Preliminary Notification Of Event Or Unusual Occurrence – PNO-III-08-009; <http://pbadupws.nrc.gov/docs/ML0825/ML082590668.pdf>

External links
Nuclear Tourist: Monticello Nuclear Power Plant

Energy infrastructure completed in 1971
Buildings and structures in Wright County, Minnesota
Nuclear power plants in Minnesota
Xcel Energy